This is a list of current and former national capital cities in the Philippines, which includes during the time of the Spanish colonization, the First Philippine Republic, the Commonwealth of the Philippines, the Second Republic of the Philippines (Japanese-sponsored Republic), the Third Republic of the Philippines, the Fourth Republic of the Philippines and the current Fifth Republic of the Philippines.

The current capital city, Manila, was the capital of country throughout most of its history and was honored / designated again with the title through a presidential order on June 24, 1976.

Historical background
On April 7, 1521 Ferdinand Magellan landed in Cebu. He was welcomed by Rajah Humabon, who, together with his wife and about 800 natives, were baptized by the Spaniards on April 14, 1521, and are considered to be the first Filipino Catholics. Magellan, however, failed to successfully claim the Philippines for the crown of Spain, having been slain in neighboring Mactan Island by Datu Lapulapu.

A Spanish expedition ordered by the conquistador Miguel Lopez de Legazpi demanded the conquest of Manila. His second on command, Martín de Goiti departed from Cebu and arrived in Manila. The Muslim Tagalogs welcomed the foreigners, but Goiti had other plans. The Spanish force of 300 soldiers marched through Manila and a battle was fought with the heavily armed Spaniards quickly defeating and crushing the native settlements to the ground. Legazpi and his men followed the next year and made a peace pact with the three rajahs and organized a city council consisting of two mayors, 12 councilors, and a secretary.

A walled city known as Intramuros, at the southern banks of Pasig River was built to protect the Spanish colonizers. On June 10, 1574, King Philip II of Spain gave Manila the title of Insigne y Siempre Leal Ciudad ("Distinguished and Ever Loyal City"). In 1595, Manila was proclaimed as the capital of the Philippine Islands and became a center of the trans-Pacific silver trade for more than three centuries.

When the British captured Manila during the Seven Years' War, they temporarily transferred the capital to Bacolor, Pampanga, and moved back to Manila after the signing of the 1763 Treaty of Paris.

When the Philippine Revolution erupted in 1896, the town of Malolos in the province of Bulacan became the headquarters of the revolutionary army yet several other towns became capitals, at a succeeding rate to avoid capture from the Americans during the Philippine–American War. The status of the national capital moved back to Manila after capture of President Emilio Aguinaldo on 1901.

1905 Burnham Plan of Manila

When the Americans came they decided that Intramuros was not big enough, nor appropriate for their new colony. They called in the famous architect and planner, Daniel Burnham, one of the proponents of City Beautiful movement, to design the new capital. This he did in grand fashion using Washington D.C. as a model. The national civic center was placed outside the old walls in the open field called Bagumbayan. Burnham planned a large capitol building surrounded by supporting government offices in a formal setting that was close to a mirror image of Washington's. The National Mall is now our Luneta, or Rizal Park. Only the Agriculture and Finance Buildings were built of the original civic group. The National Library was also built in the 1920s but turned into the Legislative Building in lieu of the Capitol that could not get built because of budgetary cuts.Governor General Francis Burton Harrison used funds intended for the Burnham Plan to build an Executive Building in Malacañang Palace. Improvement proposed by Burnham includes waterfront parks and parkways; the city's street system; construction of buildings, waterways, and summer resorts.

Burnham proposed a parkway along Manila bay extending from the Luneta southward all the way to Cavite. This was to be a 250’ wide boulevard – with roadways, tramways, bridle paths, rich plantations, and broad sidewalks and should be made available to all classes of people. Burnham further recommended – shaded drives along the Pasig all the way to Ft. McKinley, which we now know as Fort Bonifacio, and beyond as part of the park and parkway system. Burnham ended his report by the following words:

—Daniel Burnham

By 1928 a major revision of the plan was undertaken. A committee led by Manuel Mañosa, Sr. and Juan Arellano produced a Zoning Plan for Manila based on the original Burnham Plan. This was printed and distributed free to the public for feedback. The final drawings and documents were recommended for approval in 1933 and eventually became the basis for Manila's first zoning ordinances.

Burnham's Manila plan was prepared for a city with a maximum population of 800,000 people. The population of the city of Manila was only 285,000 in 1918, but it grew at 5.6 percent per year to more than 600,000 in 1939. At that rate, Manila would have been filled to capacity.

But then in the 1930s just as the Commonwealth government had finally built the Burnham Plan's seaside drive – named Dewey Boulevard and finally finished the Post Office Building, the Finance and Agriculture Buildings, it decided to scrap the Burnham Plan and replace it with a new metropolis elsewhere. One of the main reasons given was that the proposed National Capitol to be built in the vicinity of the present-day Rizal Park was too susceptible to naval bombardment.

After Burham left, William Parsons became Consulting Architect of the Philippine Commission. Among Parsons’ accomplishments in Manila were the Philippine General Hospital, the Manila Hotel, the Manila Army and Navy Club, and the Philippine Normal University

1941 Frost-Arellano Plan of Quezon City
During the time of the Commonwealth, Manila still served as the nation's capital. During these times too that Commonwealth President Manuel L. Quezon dreamed of a city that could become the future capital of the country, replacing Manila. In the summer of 1939 President Quezon contacted William Parsons and asked him to choose a new site for and then to design a new Philippine capital. Parsons arrived in June 1939 and eventually chose Diliman as the new capital site. He also managed to produce a master plan for the new University of the Philippines. Unfortunately he died in December of that year. Harry Frost, Parsons’ former partner took over and joined Juan Arellano and A. D. Williams in the Planning Commission. A fourth member of the team, landscape architect Louis P. Croft joined them as advisor on planning and park design. They were commissioned to produce a master plan for Quezon City; this was approved in 1941.

The elliptical circle was the focal point of a grand quadrangle defined by the geographically named avenues and reached by a grand boulevard connecting it to the very center of old Manila via Quezon Bridge. The circle was to house the new legislative complex, a magnificent group of buildings with the halls of Senate and the House. Executive Mansion or Presidential palace to its left (currently occupied by the Veterans Memorial Medical Center) and the Supreme Court complex to its right (the current site of East Avenue Medical Center). All of these complexes were set in landscaped sites and surrounded by public parks and open spaces. The new National Capital City complex was thus defined with the three branches of government connected and framed by the Diliman Quadrangle. The portion of Batasan Hills was reserved for the campus of Philippine Military Academy.

The elliptical circle was turned to a memorial to Quezon. The 400 hectares of the Diliman quadrangle was allocated by the commission as the city's central park. This central park was to contain the national botanic garden, the national zoo, athletic grounds, a grand stadium and even a golf course. The park was to be the main component of a comprehensive citywide park and parkway system. This system would have included another 80-hectare park in the north, various parks and greenbelts along creeks and rivers, numerous playgrounds and athletic fields. A 46-hectare area (currently occupied by SM City North EDSA) was proposed to be the location of the National Exposition Grounds which was originally intended to host the 1946 World's fair, adjacent to it is the proposed Scientific Government Center. The transfer of the main campus of the University of the Philippines was also part of the master plan, as well as the planning of housing projects and business and industrial hubs. Finally, there was to be a major greenbelt all along the Marikina and San Mateo valley – to contain urban sprawl, preserve the agricultural land and protect the city's watershed areas. None of the intended parks and parkway system was ever built.

During the Japanese-sponsored Second Philippine Republic and throughout World War II, the City of Greater Manila, established in 1941 combining Manila and adjacent municipalities, still served as the nation's capital. However Baguio serve as the temporary capital of government in exile and the site where General Tomoyuki Yamashita and Vice Admiral Okochi surrendered.

Quezon died in exile during the war years. After the war, Quezon City was put back on track as capital of an independent republic. In 1945, President Sergio Osmeña, who had taken over when Quezon died, organized the Quezon Memorial Committee (QMC) to raise funds for a memorial.

In 1946 newly elected President Manuel Roxas created a Capital Site Committee to look at other possible sites. The old capitol site was not deemed defensible enough from military attack nor the area large enough to accommodate a projected population of several million people. Sixteen other sites were evaluated. The committee was formed to look at 16 other options to Novaliches. These included, among others: Tagaytay, Cebu, Davao, San Pablo, Baguio, Los Baños, Montalban, Antipolo, and Fort McKinley. The committee even considered moving the capital to Boracay Island but the raised elevation of Novaliches was finally chosen. The original Diliman area was thus enlarged to include the Novaliches watershed to the North all the way to Wack Wack in the south. In essence, the Frost Plan was revived under the National Planning Commission first headed by Croft then later by Harvard-trained Anselmo Alquinto. The plan was revised in 1947, 1949 and finally in 1956.

In 1949, the civic center under these revisions was to be moved northeast from the elliptical circle to a 158 hectare area called Constitution Hill. The three branches of government and support offices were laid in a formal layout. In the middle was to be a 20 hectare Plaza of the Republic. in the middle right of the plaza was the proposed capitol housing the Congress of the Philippines; the proposed Palace of the Chief Executive that will replaced Malacañang Palace as the official residence of the president at its left; and an area allotted for the Supreme Court of the Philippines and other constitutional bodies. The whole complex was to be connected to Manila by an east–west parkway called Republic Avenue where a War Heroes Memorial was planned to be located.. That plan was submitted and approved by President Quirino but it would take close to thirty years before the Batasan Pambansa was completed in 1978.

Transfer of Nation's Capital to Manila and Designation of Metro Manila as Seat of Government
During President Ferdinand Marcos' period of Bagong Lipunan (New Society), Quezon City's stature of being the nation's capital was transferred to Manila and Greater Manila Area (later, Metro Manila) designated as the seat of government on June 24, 1976, by Presidential Decree No. 940. President Marcos also considered an alternative site for the national capital. A joint study was conducted by the architecture and planning offices of Cesar Concio and Felipe Mendoza, comparing the original Novaliches site and a newly reclaimed stretch of land south of the new Cultural Center of the Philippines. but the Novaliches was still chosen for the proposed capital.

During the administration of Fidel V. Ramos there were suggestions during his term to move the nation's capital to Fort Bonifacio as part of the conversion plans then. While Gloria Macapagal Arroyo proposed that the nation's capital to move to Cebu City.

Manila remains the capital city of the Philippines, but the administrative and political centers of the national government are spread throughout Metro Manila with the Executive (Malacañan Palace) and the Judiciary (Supreme Court) both in Manila while the legislative branch is located in two separate locations: The House of Representatives in Quezon City and the Senate in Pasay. The Senate would eventually move to Bonifacio Global City in Taguig by 2020, while the New Supreme Court Building is expected to be completed before the 2022 presidential elections.

Other capitals
Baguio was formerly designated as the "summer capital" of the country from 1903 to 1976. A presidential mansion is within the city limits, and the Supreme Court still holds their April–May summer sessions at Baguio. Presidential Decree No. 940 of 1976 made no mention of Baguio continuing to serve as the "summer capital", but the city still holds the distinction in an unofficial capacity.

Chronology

Other former sovereign capitals

Proposed capitals
Due to overpopulation, traffic congestion and high vulnerability to natural disasters in the current capital, Manila, various lawmakers have suggested to shift the capital of the Philippines. In May 2012, Francisco Calalay, Jr., a Quezon city councilor urged Congress to shift the capital onto Quezon City. In February 2016, an Australian businessman Peter Wallace suggested 'Subic-Clark' to be the next Philippine capital. In February 2017, a panel was formed by the House of Representatives for the possible shifting of the country's capital. In March 2017, then-House Speaker Pantaleon Alvarez stated that the capital of a federal Philippines should be 'somewhere in Negros island'. In January 2018, two congressmen, Ron Salo and Ciriaco Calalang filed a bill, proposed shifting the country's capital to Davao City, the hometown of the incumbent President Rodrigo Duterte. However, they proposed that the Malacañang Palace in Manila shall remain as the President's official residence. In August 2019, Senator Sherwin Gatchalian filed a bill, proposed that the seat of government should transfer to New Clark City located in Capas, Tarlac by the year 2030.

References

Philippines
Politics of the Philippines
History of the Philippines